El Grillo (Spanish for "the cricket") may refer to:
 El Grillo (song), a song by Josquin des Prez published in 1505
 SS El Grillo, a British oil tanker sunk during World War II
 Nickname of football coach Jorge Roldán (born 1940)

See also
 Grillo (disambiguation)